S. argentina may refer to: 

 Scutigera argentina, a centipede
 Squatina argentina, the Argentine angelshark

See also
Argentina (disambiguation)